Mario Alberto Rosas Montero (born 22 May 1980), better known simply as Mario Rosas, is a Spanish former footballer who played as an attacking midfielder. He was most recently the manager. 

An unsuccessful youth graduate at Barcelona, he went on to appear in 308 Segunda División matches over 12 professional seasons, in representation of five teams, mainly Castellón.

Playing career
Rosas was born in Málaga, Andalusia. Another product of FC Barcelona's prolific youth system, La Masia, he quickly excelled at their reserves, making his first-team debut on 15 May 1998 in a 1–4 home loss for the already crowned champions against UD Salamanca, in what would be his only La Liga appearance for the Catalans.

Released by Barça in 2000, Rosas signed with another team in the top flight, Deportivo Alavés, but failed to appear regularly, being also loaned to second division's Salamanca in his second season. His career would be highly irregular the following years, with outputs of less than five games – CD Numancia, Cádiz CF, both in the same level – and also playing with Girona FC in division three, with relegation.

Rosas then joined another club in the second tier, CD Castellón, for 2005–06. After a slow first year he became an undisputed starter, adding a combined 16 league goals the next three. On 7 September 2008, he scored twice – one from a penalty kick, one of his specialties– in a 2–0 home win over RC Celta de Vigo.

In early August 2010, after Murcia's relegation, the 30-year-old Rosas agreed to a two-year deal at former side Salamanca. After meeting the same fate in Castile and León, he terminated his contract and moved abroad for the first time in his career, signing for FK Khazar Lankaran ,a Azerbaijan Premier League club in Azerbaijan.

On 5 December 2012, Hércules CF acquired both Rosas and Pablo Redondo, who were free agents.

Managerial career 
Rosas managed Tercera División club Novelda CF between 2018 and 2019.

Šibenik
On 14 June 2021, Rosas became the new manager of Croatian Prva HNL club HNK Šibenik. Šibenik opened the 2021–22 domestic league season with a 0–3 away defeat to Osijek on 16 July. In the next three games, Šibenik went on to lose to Gorica (3–1) and Hajduk Split (1–0), and played 1–1 with Slaven Belupo.

On 15 August, Šibenik came to its first win in the league in the first game at home in the league season, defeating Hrvatski Dragovoljac 6–2, with two goals from both Stipe Bačelić-Grgić and Antonio Marin, and one goal from Ivan Delić and Marin Jakoliš. After that, Šibenik failed to defeat Rijeka away (2–1), and managed to beat Istra 1961 at home (3–1), with a goal from Delić in both matches, and two goals from Marin Jakoliš in the latter game.

On 5 January 2022, Rosas parted ways with Šibenik.

Managerial statistics

References

External links

Stats and bio at Cadistas1910 

1980 births
Living people
Footballers from Málaga
Spanish footballers
Association football midfielders
La Liga players
Segunda División players
Segunda División B players
Tercera División players
FC Barcelona Atlètic players
FC Barcelona players
Deportivo Alavés players
UD Salamanca players
CD Numancia players
Cádiz CF players
Girona FC players
CD Castellón footballers
Real Murcia players
SD Huesca footballers
Hércules CF players
CD Eldense footballers
Azerbaijan Premier League players
Khazar Lankaran FK players
Spain youth international footballers
Spanish expatriate footballers
Expatriate footballers in Azerbaijan
Spanish expatriate sportspeople in Azerbaijan
HNK Šibenik managers